"Elysium (I Go Crazy)" is the 5th single by Liverpool dance trio Ultrabeat. It was released in 2006 and played throughout the summer of that year. Ultrabeat used the vocals of Rebecca Rudd to Scott Brown's hardcore cult hit "Elysium" and gave it a trance remix, achieving further commercial success for a song which is perceived by many hardcore fans as a great dance anthem.

The song represented a bit of a change in style for Ultrabeat as this song and "Sure Feels Good" were slightly more hardcore songs than previous Ultrabeat singles, as they were both collaborations with hardcore artists.

It reached #38 in the UK Singles Chart and got #1 in the MTV Dance Galaxy Chart.

Track listing

12" Promo
Extended Version
Alex K Remix
Scott Brown Remix
Styles & Breeze Remix
Major Players Remix
Friday Night Posse Remix
Promo CD
Extended Mix
Alex K Remix
Friday Night Posse Remix
Styles & Breeze Remix
Scott Brown Remix
Major Players Remix
Kenny Hayes Remix
CD Single
Radio Edit
Extended Mix
Styles & Breeze Remix
Scott Brown Remix
Friday Night Posse Remix
Major Players Remix

12" Single
Extended Mix
Friday Night Posse Remix
Alex K Remix
Scott Brown Remix
Download
Radio Edit – (3:21)
Extended Mix – (6:10)
Styles & Breeze Remix – (7:02)
Scott Brown Remix – (6:24)
Friday Night Posse Remix – (7:58)
Major Players Remix – (7:00)
Alex K Remix – (6:27)
Flip & Fill Remix – (5:46)
KB Project Remix – (5:59)
Kenny Hayes Remix – (7:25)
Waveshapers Remix – (6:37)
Lee S Remix – (7:03)

Music video

The video was filmed in 2006 and was directed by Mike Cockayne. It shows a crowd of people in a nightclub waiting for Rebecca Rudd, the only  barmaid, to serve them. She is singing the words to the song. When she sees a man she likes chatting to another woman she smashes a glass on the floor along with a bar full of glasses. She then climbs on to the bar, looking down on the crowd and still singing the song. She Jumps into the crowd and 'crowd surfs' on her back.

She is then on a small platform singing the song with two other dancers, while the crowd is dancing. The video then switches between Rebecca Rudd singing, the two dancers, the crowd dancing, and Rebecca Rudd 'crowd surfing' before it shows Rebecca Rudd cleaning up the empty bar (indicating her being left alone again) and a single dancer on the empty platform at the end of the video.

Trivia
The single was consistently mistitled as "Elysium - I Go Crazy" (i.e. a song called "I Go Crazy" by an artist or group called "Elysium"), leading to this being its name on playlists/charts from MTV Dance and similar stations.  It is also mistitled as "Don't Leave Me Hangin'"; the name being taken from the lyrics of the single.

Chart performance

External links
 AATW.com
 Ultrabeat artist page at AATW.com
 Elysium (I Go Crazy) music video at AATW.com
 Listen to Elysium (I Go Crazy) at AATW.com

Ultrabeat songs
2006 singles
Scott Brown songs
2006 songs
Songs written by Mike Di Scala